St. Albans Chesapeake and Ohio Railroad Depot, also known as St. Albans Depot, is a historic railroad depot located at St. Albans, Kanawha County, West Virginia.  It was built in 1906 by the Chesapeake and Ohio Railroad.  It has a 1 1/2 story central block with one story wings and a hipped roof.  It originally had a square watch tower. The frame building is clad in clapboard siding.  The station closed about 1963 and remained vacant until the city purchased the land from CSX Transportation in 1991 and CSX donated the station.

It was listed on the National Register of Historic Places in 1997.

Passenger services
Fast Flying Virginian
Sportsman

References

Railway stations in the United States opened in 1906
Buildings and structures in Kanawha County, West Virginia
National Register of Historic Places in Kanawha County, West Virginia
Railway stations on the National Register of Historic Places in West Virginia
Stations along Chesapeake and Ohio Railway lines
St. Albans, West Virginia
Former railway stations in West Virginia